Giorgi Chanturia (born 11 April 1993) is a Georgian former footballer who played as a right winger.

Career

Spain
Chanturia began his career on Saburtalo Tbilisi, and was loaned to Barcelona in June 2009. He was filled into Barça's Juvenil B squad, and scored 11 goals to help the Catalans to the league title.

Vitesse
In August 2010, after being linked with Chelsea, Chanturia signed with Vitesse Arnhem. In April 2011 he signed a three-year deal with the club.

Chanturia made his competitive debut for Vitesse on the opening day of the 2011–12 Eredivisie season, as a starter in their 0–0 away draw against ADO Den Haag on 7 August. He scored his first goal for the Arnhem side in his second official match, against VVV-Venlo in a 4–0 win.

In December 2012, Chanturia was loaned to Alania Vladikavkaz until the end of the season. He returned to Vitesse at the end of the season, and was reintegrated to first-team squad for the 2013–14 season.

CFR Cluj
On 19 February 2014, CFR Cluj have confirmed the signing of Vitesse midfielder Giorgi Chanturia for an undisclosed fee.

Hellas Verona
On 12 June 2014, Chanturia joined Hellas Verona from Cluj.

Return to Cluj on loan
However, in September Chanturia returned to Cluj on loan with Hellas sporting director Scala Sogliano stating that the club had "decided to give [Chanturia] the opportunity to find his best form" and that Chanturia wanted "his debut with the Verona [to live] up to expectations".

MSV Duisburg
On 25 September 2015, 2. Bundesliga club MSV Duisburg announced their signing of free agent Chanturia on a contract running until the end of the season including the option for further two years.

Ural Yekaterinburg
On 5 July 2016, he moved to Russia, signing with FC Ural Yekaterinburg. In April 2018 he suffered an ACL injury, it took him 6 months to recover and he couldn't regain his squad position after that. On 18 January 2019, he was released from his Ural contract by mutual consent.

International career
He made his first international appearance for Georgia in a friendly match against Liechtenstein on 5 March 2014. He scored only 25 minutes into his debut.

Career statistics

International goals
Scores and results list Georgia's goal tally first.

References

https://sportall.ge/fekhburthi/fekhburthii/legionerebi/125156-tcanturia-serkhi-roberto-ikardi-rafinia-vin-iyvnen-da-sad-arian-dghes-barseloneli-thanagundelebi.html

External links
 
 
 

1993 births
Living people
Footballers from Tbilisi
Footballers from Georgia (country)
Georgia (country) youth international footballers
Georgia (country) under-21 international footballers
Georgia (country) international footballers
SBV Vitesse players
FC Spartak Vladikavkaz players
CFR Cluj players
Hellas Verona F.C. players
MSV Duisburg players
FC Ural Yekaterinburg players
2. Bundesliga players
Eredivisie players
Russian Premier League players
Liga I players
Expatriate footballers from Georgia (country)
Expatriate sportspeople from Georgia (country) in the Netherlands
Expatriate sportspeople from Georgia (country) in Spain
FC Barcelona players
Expatriate sportspeople from Georgia (country) in Russia
Expatriate sportspeople from Georgia (country) in Romania
Expatriate sportspeople from Georgia (country) in Germany
Expatriate footballers in the Netherlands
Expatriate footballers in Russia
Expatriate footballers in Romania
Expatriate footballers in Italy
Expatriate footballers in Germany
Association football midfielders